The WordMasters Challenge is an international Language Arts competition for students in grades 3 - 8.  The assigned words increase in difficulty at each grade level. The "Challenge" tests take place three times a year in the students' classrooms and are scored on how well the kids are able to use their knowledge of the words to complete twenty analogies. The WordMasters Challenge encourages growth not only in vocabulary, but in critical thinking and verbal reasoning.  Nearly 3,000 teams from throughout the United States and several foreign countries participate in this yearly competition.

There are three competitions each school year taking place about two months apart. On the first competition, students are tested on 25 words assigned to them. On the second competition, they are assigned 25 new words and are tested on all 50 words. On the third competition, they are assigned 25 additional words and are tested on all 75 words they have learned over the course of the school year.

Authenticity Controversy
 WordMasters Challenge is not currently recognized by any national educational bodies.
 WordMasters Challenge does not disclose who owns or operated the organization or the domain.
 The testing is conducted at each school and is unmonitored by organization. Accuracy of test results submitted to the organization cannot be verified. 
 The company is not sponsored or supported by any donations, and appears to generate revenue from selling the competition preparation booklets and testing supplies to the schools that it reaches through direct marketing.
 The company does not provide street address or email address as forms of contact on its website.
 The competition fits the profile of literary vanity contests. "Winning prizes from these organizations will add little to your resume, and may even make you look amateurish to publishers and other poets."

References

External links

Student quiz competitions